is a single released by Gackt on March 19, 2003 under Nippon Crown. It peaked at second place on the Oricon weekly chart and charted for ten weeks. It was certified gold by RIAJ.

Track listing

References

2003 singles
Gackt songs